During 1998, tropical cyclones formed within seven different tropical cyclone basins, located within various parts of the Atlantic, Pacific, and Indian Oceans. A total of 125 tropical cyclones formed, with 72 of them being named by various weather agencies when they attained maximum sustained winds of 35 knots (65 km/h, 40 mph). Hurricane Mitch of late October was the deadliest tropical cyclone, killing 11,000 people as it catastrophically affected Central America, and Mexico as a Category 5 major hurricane. Meanwhile, Georges became the costliest, with the damages amounting to $9.37 billion, which also became the costliest in the history of the Dominican Republic and the country of Saint Kitts and Nevis. Throughout the year, Category 5 tropical cyclones formed.

Global atmospheric and hydrological conditions
A strong La Niña started in 1998 and persisted until early 2001.

Summary

North Atlantic Ocean 

An average Atlantic hurricane season features 12 tropical storms, 6 hurricanes, and 3 major hurricanes, and features an Accumulated Cyclone Energy (ACE) count of 106. In 2020 in the North Atlantic basin, all of the statistics fell well above listed, featuring a record-breaking 30 tropical storms, 13 hurricanes, and 6 major hurricanes, with an ACE total of 178.

The 1998 Atlantic hurricane season was one of the most disastrous Atlantic hurricane seasons on record, featuring the highest number of storm-related fatalities in over 218 years and one of the costliest ever at the time. The season had above average activity, due to the dissipation of the El Niño event and transition to La Niña conditions.

The most notable storms were Hurricane Georges and Hurricane Mitch. Georges devastated Saint Kitts and Nevis, Puerto Rico and the Dominican Republic as a major Category 3 storm but peaked as a high-end Category 4 hurricane just before moving through many of the Caribbean Islands before affecting the southern US mainland, making its landfall near Biloxi, Mississippi, causing significant damage and at least 600 confirmed deaths while Mitch, the strongest storm of the season, was a very powerful and destructive late-season Category 5 hurricane that affected much of Central America before making landfall in Florida as a tropical storm. The significant amount of rainfall that Mitch produced across Central America caused significant damage and killed at least 11,000 people, making the system the second deadliest Atlantic hurricane in recorded history, behind only the Great Hurricane of 1780.
Mitch, was later tied with 2007's Hurricane Dean for the eighth-most intense Atlantic hurricane ever recorded.

Hurricanes Georges and Mitch caused $9.37 billion in damage and $6.08 billion (1998 USD) in damage, respectively and the 1998 Atlantic hurricane season was at the time, the second-costliest season ever, after the 1992 season. However, it is now the eleventh costliest season as it was surpassed by the 2005 Atlantic hurricane season.

Eastern and central Pacific Ocean 

An average Pacific hurricane season features 15 tropical storms, 9 hurricanes, and 4 major hurricanes, and features an Accumulated Cyclone Energy (ACE) count of 132.

The season produced 13 named storms, slightly below the average of 15 named storms per season. However, the season total of nine hurricanes was one above the average, and the total of six major hurricanes surpassed the average of three. Activity during the season was hindered by the northward movement of the Intertropical Convergence Zone (ITCZ). The ITCZ, which is normally situated south of the Gulf of Tehuantepec, shifted northward into Central and Southern Mexico, making the cyclone closer to cooler sea surface temperatures, hence limiting the number of storms that formed during the season. Although a semi-permanent anticyclone persisted through the summer of 1998, causing most of the storms to remain at sea, some storm did threaten the Baja California Peninsula due to a weakness in the anticyclone. Except for Hurricane Kay, all of the storms of the season originated from tropical waves.

Western Pacific Ocean 

 
The average typhoon season lasts year-round, with the majority of the storms forming between May and October. An average Pacific typhoon season features 26 tropical storms, 16 typhoons, and 9 super typhoons (unofficial category). It also features an average Accumulated Cyclone Energy (ACE) count of approximately 294; the basin is typically the most active basin for tropical cyclone formation.

During the 1998 Pacific typhoon season, a total of 28 tropical depressions developed across the western Pacific basin. Of those 28 depressions, a total of 18 strengthened into tropical storms of which 9 further intensified into typhoons. The first tropical cyclone developed on May 28, marking the fourth latest start to any Pacific typhoon season on record, and the last one dissipated on December 22. The Philippine region also set a record: with only eleven storms forming or moving into its area of responsibility, PAGASA had its quietest season as of 2006. Overall inactivity was caused by an unusually strong La Niña, which also fueled a hyperactive Atlantic hurricane season that year.

North Indian Ocean 

With eleven depressions and eight tropical cyclones, this was one of the most active seasons in the ocean along with 1987, 1996, and 2005. The season caused a large loss of life, most of which was from one storm. Over 10,000 people were killed in India when Tropical Cyclone 03A brought a 4.9-metre (16 ft) storm surge to the Kathiawar Peninsula, inundating numerous salt mines. Total damages from the storm amounted to Rs. 120 billion (US$3 billion). Tropical Cyclone 01B killed at least 26 people and left at least 4,000 fishermen missing in eastern Bangladesh on May 20. A short lived depression in mid-October killed 122 people after triggering severe flooding in Andhra Pradesh. In November, Tropical Cyclone 06B killed six people and caused property damage worth BTN 880 million (US$20.7 million) in eastern India. An additional 40 people were killed and 100 fishermen were listed as missing after Tropical Cyclone 07B affected Bangladesh.

South-West Indian Ocean

January–June 

The 1997–98 South-West Indian Ocean cyclone season was fairly quiet and had the latest start in 30 years. The first tropical disturbance originated on January 16, although the first named storm, Anacelle, was not upgraded until February 8, a record late start. The last storm to dissipate was an unusually late tropical depression in late July. Many of the storms suffered from the effects of wind shear, which contributed to there being only one tropical cyclone – equivalent to a minimal hurricane. The season also occurred during a powerful El Niño.

Tropical Depression A1, the first of the season, moved throughout most of Mozambique in January, causing landslides and flooding. One landslide affected Milange District, where many houses were swept into a river. Landslides killed between 87 and 143 people in the country. Although Anacelle was the first named storm of the season, another tropical depression preceded it that crossed Madagascar several times. The depression eventually became Tropical Storm Beltane, and lasted 17 days. Beltane caused flooding across Madagascar due to heavy rainfall, which killed one person and left locally heavy crop damage. There were several other disturbances in February, including Cindy which dissipated 50 days after it originated, as well as a disturbance that brought heavy rainfall to Réunion and Mauritius. The rest of the season was fairly quiet, mostly with short-lived tropical disturbances or storms.

July–December 
 
The first system of the season proper originated out of an area of convection in early September in the northeast portion of the basin. On September 3, the MFR initiated advisories on Tropical Disturbance A1 about 1435 km (890 mi) east of Diego Garcia. The system tracked westward, and the JTWC issued a Tropical Cyclone Formation Alert (TCFA) on September 4. Later in the month, Tropical Disturbance A2 formed in a similar region within the monsoon trough, with the MFR initiating advisories on September 29. Also on that day, the JTWC began issuing advisories on Tropical Cyclone 02S. That day, the JTWC upgraded the system to tropical storm status, although strong wind shear prevented intensification. The MFR quickly discontinued advisories, but the JTWC continued tracking it, again upgrading the system to tropical storm status on October 1. After the shear again increased, the storm weakened, dissipating on October 2.

In November, rapidly weakening Tropical Cyclone Alison moved from the Australian basin and dissipated immediately upon entering the south-west Indian Ocean on November 13. On December 4, short-lived Tropical Disturbance A3 was classified by MFR, subsequently drifting into the Australian region. Possibly related to the previous system, Tropical Cyclone Cathy moved from the Australian basin into the basin on December 28, quickly dissipating.

Australian Region

January–June 
 
The 1997–98 Australian region cyclone season was a slightly below-average tropical cyclone season. Cyclone Katrina formed on January 1, which erratically moved around Australia in its lifetime. Tiffany and Les also formed in January, affecting Western Australia and Northern Territory, with the latter causing 3 deaths. Cyclone Victor formed from a tropical low that was the remnant low of Cyclone Katrina, before renaming Cindy as it crossed to the South-West Indian Ocean basin. A tropical low also crossed to the same basin, which strengthened to Tropical Cyclone Elsie before weakening. Nathan also formed in March, peaking as a Category 2 cyclone before dissipating on March 26. The post-tropical cyclone that was former Yali in the South Pacific crossed the region before re-exiting the basin towards New Zealand. The last tropical low of the season dissipated on April 19 as it brought downpour to the Western Australia.

July–December 

On 7 October, a tropical low near the Cocos (Keeling) Islands strengthened to Tropical Cyclone Zelia, while becoming the first storm of the season. It weakened due to wind shear and dissipated on 10 October. A month later, Alison developed over the open waters near Western Australia, peaking as a severe tropical cyclone before passing near Cocos Islands, bringing gale-force winds before dissipating on 13 November, shortly before crossing to the South-West Indian Ocean basin. Billy and Thelma both affected Western Australia and Northern Territory both as severe tropical cyclones, with the latter causing a death, ten months after the cyclone's passage. A disturbance crossed to the basin, before degenerating afterwards. Cathy was believed to be the remnant low of the former disturbance. Peaking as a Category 2 cyclone, it exited the basin on 28 December before dissipating immediately. The last disturbance formed near Brisbane before dissipating on 2 January.

South Pacific Ocean

January–June 
 
The 1997–98 season was one of the most active and longest South Pacific tropical cyclone seasons on record, with 16 tropical cyclones occurring within the South Pacific basin between 160°E and 120°W. The season was characterised by a very strong El Niño event, which caused the South Pacific convergence zone, to move from its usual position near the Solomon Islands to the Northern Cook Islands. As a result, ten tropical cyclones formed to the east of the International Date Line, with seven of these tropical cyclones going on to affect French Polynesia.

Severe Tropical Cyclones Ron and Susan were both the strongest tropical cyclones of the season and were thought to be the strongest tropical cyclones in the region since Severe Tropical Cyclone Hina of the 1984–85 season.

After the final warnings on Cyclone Tui were issued a weak circulation remained in the vicinity of Samoa for several days, before a westerly surge from the monsoon resulted in a tropical cyclone developing during February 1. However, due to uncertainties in the continuation of Tui after several other weak low-pressure areas had formed, the FMS decided to treat the cyclone as a separate system and named it Wes.

Tropical Cyclone Bart developed during the final days of the season and caused ten deaths and minor damage to French Polynesia, before it dissipated during May 3. The names Katrina, Martin, Nute, Osea, Ron, Susan, Tui, Ursula and Veli, were subsequently retired from the lists of names for the region.

July–December 

The 1998–99 South Pacific cyclone season was a near-average South Pacific tropical cyclone season, with 8 tropical cyclones occurring within the South Pacific Ocean basin between 160°E and 120°W. Despite the season starting on November 1, the first tropical system of the season did not form until December 1, while the final disturbance of the season dissipated on May 27, 1999. During the season the most intense tropical cyclone was Severe Tropical Cyclone Cora, which had a minimum pressure of 930 hPa (27.46 inHg). After the season had ended the names Cora along with Dani in 1999 were retired from the naming lists, after they had caused significant impacts on South Pacific islands.

The first, Tropical Disturbance 01F, developed about 540 km (340 mi) to the northwest of Apia in American Samoa, however, the system remained weak and was last noted later that day. On December 11, the JTWC started to monitor an area of disturbed weather that had developed within a trough of low pressure, about 670 km (415 mi) to the northeast of Honiara in the Solomon Islands. The depression turned to the south and accelerated as it began to lose tropical characteristics. It passed about 210 nmi west of Norfolk Island and had become extratropical about 400 nmi west-northwest of New Zealand's North Cape on December 17. 02F and Cora followed suit, with the latter affecting Fiji and Tonga. On December 25, Tropical Disturbance 04F developed over the Coral Sea within an area of strong vertical wind shear in the Australian region. During that day 04F moved towards the southeast and entered the South Pacific basin, before dissipating on December 26.

Mediterranean Sea 

A medicane was observed from 25 to 27 January.

Systems

January

The month of January was relatively active, with 9 tropical cyclones forming, with 8 of them are being named.

February

Like the previous month, the month of February featured nine storms, of which four are respectively named.

March

The month of March featured 7 tropical cyclones forming, with 6 of them are being named.

April

6 systems formed in April, with 3 of them are respectively named.

May

June

July

August

September

October

November

December

Global effects
There are a total of 9 tropical cyclone basins, 7 are seasonal and two are non-seasonal, thus all 8 basins except the Mediterranean are active. In this table, data from all these basins are added.

See also

 Tropical cyclones by year
 List of earthquakes in 1998
 Tornadoes of 1998

Notes
2 Only systems that formed either on or after January 1, 1998 are counted in the seasonal totals.
3 Only systems that formed either before or on December 31, 1998 are counted in the seasonal totals.4 The wind speeds for this tropical cyclone/basin are based on the IMD Scale which uses 3-minute sustained winds.
5 The wind speeds for this tropical cyclone/basin are based on the Saffir Simpson Scale which uses 1-minute sustained winds.
6The wind speeds for this tropical cyclone are based on Météo-France which uses wind gusts.

References

External links

Regional Specialized Meteorological Centers
 US National Hurricane Center – North Atlantic, Eastern Pacific
 Central Pacific Hurricane Center – Central Pacific
 Japan Meteorological Agency – NW Pacific
 India Meteorological Department – Bay of Bengal and the Arabian Sea
 Météo-France – La Reunion – South Indian Ocean from 30°E to 90°E
 Fiji Meteorological Service – South Pacific west of 160°E, north of 25° S

Tropical Cyclone Warning Centers
 Meteorology, Climatology, and Geophysical Agency of Indonesia – South Indian Ocean from 90°E to 141°E, generally north of 10°S
 Australian Bureau of Meteorology (TCWC's Perth, Darwin & Brisbane) – South Indian Ocean & South Pacific Ocean from 90°E to 160°E, generally south of 10°S
 Papua New Guinea National Weather Service – South Pacific Ocean from 141°E to 160°E, generally north of 10°S
 Meteorological Service of New Zealand Limited – South Pacific west of 160°E, south of 25°S

Tropical cyclones by year
1998 Atlantic hurricane season
1998 Pacific hurricane season
1998 Pacific typhoon season
1998 North Indian Ocean cyclone season
1997–98 Australian region cyclone season
1998–99 Australian region cyclone season
1997–98 South Pacific cyclone season
1998–99 South Pacific cyclone season
1997–98 South-West Indian Ocean cyclone season
1998–99 South-West Indian Ocean cyclone season
1998-related lists